Velma S. Salabiye (1948 – 1996) was a Navajo librarian and promoter of Native American librarianship. Salabiye served as the director of the University of California, Los Angeles American Indian Culture Center Library and was a founding member of the American Indian Library Association.

Early life and education

Velma S. Salabiye was born in 1948 in Bellemont, Arizona. She graduated from St. Michael Indian School in 1966. She earned a bachelor's of arts degree in education in 1971 from the University of Arizona. In 1974 she also earned a Master of Library Science degree from the University of Arizona's Indian Graduate Library Institute.

Library career

During her master's program, Salabiye interned at the Navajo Nation's Window Rock Public Library. In 1975, she created plans for what would become the Navajo Research and Statistics Center. She coordinated a meeting of the Special Libraries Association on the Navajo reservation in 1977. She was awarded a D'Arcy McNickle Fellowship from the Newberry Library Center for the History of the American Indian in 1979, studying the contributions of Navajo women to society.

Salabiye became the director of the UCLA American Indian Culture Center's library in 1980. She would serve as a librarian at UCLA until her death in 1996.

Service to Native librarianship

In a 1978 article in the American Indian Library Association newsletter, Salabiye wrote about the need for Native peoples to have access to their own historical documents, stating that Native Americans: Salabiye advocated for information about Native peoples to be located accessibly to the people it describes, such as housing tribal archives on reservations. She also recognized the need for more Native American librarians.

Throughout her career, she wrote and co-wrote multiple works on American Indian library collections, promoting American Indian librarianship and collections. In 1987 she was recognized for her efforts in supporting library services to Indian tribes with a certificate of appreciation from the U.S. Department of Education's Office of Educational Research and Improvement. She became an assistant editor of the American Indian Culture and Research Journal in 1988.

Salabiye was active in the American Library Association and was elected to the organization's council in 1994. She was a founding member of the American Indian Library Association, an ethnic affiliate group of ALA. She died in the summer of 1996.

References

1948 births
1996 deaths
University of Arizona alumni
American librarians
American women librarians
Navajo people
20th-century American women
20th-century Native Americans
20th-century Native American women
Native American librarianship